Società Sportiva Dilettantistica Alba Alcamo 1928 is an Italian association football club from Alcamo, Sicily.

The club was founded in 1928 and its official colours are black and white. Alcamo plays its home matches at Stadio Lelio Catella. The club also had a few appearances in the professional levels of Italian football, a single Serie C season in 1974–1975 and six consecutive Serie C2 campaigns from 1978–1979 to 1984–1985, with a third place in 1979 as its best result. The club also won a Coppa Italia Dilettanti in 1997.

References

External links
 Official website

Association football clubs established in 1928
Football clubs in Italy
Football clubs in Sicily
1928 establishments in Italy
Alcamo